TPT1 may refer to:
2'-phosphotransferase, an enzyme
Translationally-controlled tumor protein, a protein